10 meter running target is one of the ISSF shooting events, shot with an airgun at a target that moves sideways. The target is pulled across a two meter wide aisle at the range of 10 meters from the firing point. The target is pulled at either of two speeds, slow or fast, where it is visible for 5 or 2.5 seconds, respectively.

The course of fire is 30 slow runs followed by 30 fast runs for men, and 20 slow runs followed by 20 fast runs for women.

The men's event replaced 50 meter running target on the Olympic program starting from 1992, but after the 2004 Summer Olympics it was again taken off the program, leaving the running target shooters with no Olympic events at all. This also meant that finals were no longer held, but it has been announced that a replacement will be held in the form of knockout semi-final and final stages. Also, a separate World Championship was held in 2008, filling the void left after the Olympics.

World Championships, Men 

This event was held in 1981–2009.

World Championships, Men Team

This event was held in 1981–2009.

World Championships, Women 

This event was held in 1994–2009.

World Championships, Women Team

This event was held in 1998–2006.

World Championships, total medals

Current world records

World and Olympic Champions

Men

Women

References 

ISSF shooting events
Rifle shooting sports
10 m